Tuj (also Romanized as Tūj and Tooj; also known as Tūch) is a village in Jolgeh-e Mazhan Rural District, Jolgeh-e Mazhan District, Khusf County, South Khorasan Province, Iran. At the 2006 census, its population was 16, in 5 families.

References 

Populated places in Khusf County